The Legend of Wong Tai Sin (黃大仙) is a TVB television series premiered in 1986 based on the story of Wong Tai Sin.

Music
Theme song "The Illumination of a Thousand World" (光照萬世) and sub theme song "Passing With the Wind" (隨風而逝) were composed and arranged by Joseph Koo.  The lyricist was Tang Wai-hung and performer was Adam Cheng.

Synopsis
Rain god Chisongzi (Adam Cheng) was supposed to take orders from heaven to rain many consecutive months to punish the humans via flood storms. However he could not bear to watch the humans suffer so much. The Jade Emperor then punishes the Rain god by sending him to be reincarnated as a human on earth.

In the Eastern Jin dynasty a fortune teller predicted that the current emperor would be overthrown by someone born on August 23 that year. The emperor ordered all babies born on that date killed.  But even after the mass execution, the emperor would continue to have reoccurring nightmares about being assassinated. It turns out his own son, Prince Lung (Patrick Tse) was born on that date and ended up killing him. Lung would bring a lot of troubles to the kingdom in an effort to become the next ruler.

Rain god was now reincarnated as Wong Zo-ping, a miracle doctor and healer who tried to help many people along the way.  Later Wong Zo-ping becomes heavenly deity on earth Wong Tai-sin to face off against the corrupt empire.  He would eventually become a legendary icon.

Cast

tv remaking on film
Lam Ching-ying is now a role as Himself in the 1992 film that used by its own title and not only sequeled of an tvb tv series.

See also
 Kau cim
 Wong Tai Sin Temple

References

1986 Hong Kong television series debuts
1986 Hong Kong television series endings
TVB dramas
Television series set in the Eastern Jin (317–420)
Fantasy television series
Hong Kong wuxia television series
Television about magic
Cantonese-language television shows